Mor Mahal is a 2016 Pakistani historical fiction television fantasy series based on life of Nawab Asif Jehan of Hakim dynasty created and directed by Sarmad Khoosat, produced by Babar Javed and was originally conceptualized by Imran Aslam in 2002 and written by Sarmad Sehbai in 2004. Mor Mahal is known as one of the biggest television projects in Asia. The serial stars Umair Jaswal, Meesha Shafi Hina Khawaja Bayat, Sania Saeed and Fiza Ali in the lead roles. The cast also includes Shah Fahad, Jana Malik, Sonia Nazir, Kinza Hashmi and Ali Saleem. Umair Jaswal who played the role of a nawab alongside Meesha Shafi made his television debut.

Mor Mahal is set around 200 years back in an era of Mughal, Greek, Egyptian and Turkish civilizations and it is the first fantasy-drama to be televised in Pakistan in the last 25 years. It is also the most expensive television series of Pakistan after Bashar Momin. The series began from 24 April 2016 on Geo Entertainment and PTV Home as the production of A&B Productions.

Cast
Umair Jaswal as Nawab Asif Jehan
Meesha Shafi as Farrukh Zaad
Hina Khawaja Bayat as Begum Sarwat Jehan
Fiza Ali as Surayya Jehan
Zahid Ahmed as Kabeer
Sania Saeed as Akhtari
Jana Malik as Shaista (Kaneez-e-Khaas)
Shah Fahad as Nawab Shujaat Jehan
Sonia Nazir as Mehar Bano
 Kinza Hashmi as Banki
Umer Naru as Shehzada Taimoor
Xille Huma as Kundni
Ali Saleem as Shola Jaan
Suhaee Abro as Jaana
Mehar Bano as Shehzadi Feroza
Tahira Imam as Jaana's mother
Imran. Ali as banki's friend

Production

Background and development
Umair Jaswal who made his television debut by this serial said in an interview that he is honored to be a part of the biggest Pakistani television production and sharing the screen with some of the best actors in the industry.

The director, Sarmad Khoosat said that Mor Meahal can be called Hilal erotic of Pakistan.

Marketing
The first look poster of Mor Mahal was unveiled by Geo Entertainment in February 2016. In March 2016, Geo Entertainment released the teaser of the show via Facebook.

Broadcast
The series has 40 to 45 episodes. The first episode was aired on Geo Entertainment and PTV Home on 24 April 2016. After 26-27 episodes the show started airing on Saturday 10:00 p.m as Mannat took place on the time slot.

International  broadcast
It aired in UK on &tv UK. In Arab world, it was broadcast by Zee Aflam and Zee Alwan under the title قصر الطاووس.
In Thailand, it was dubbed in Thai language and aired on Zee Nung with the name ตำนานรัก อาณาจักรฮาคิม in early 2020 and became the first Pakistani drama serial that reached to Thailand.

References

External links

2016 Pakistani television series debuts
Fantasy television series
Geo TV original programming
Serial drama television series
Television shows set in Pakistan
2016 Pakistani television series endings
Urdu-language television shows
Pakistani period television series